Tullamore is a small town in Parkes Shire in the Central West of New South Wales, Australia.

It lies in wheat-growing country. Tullamore has a railway station on the Bogan Gate–Tottenham Branch line. It is served by a newly constructed medical centre and a K-12 central school.  Tullamore is home to the Tullamore Irish Festival, which is held each Easter long weekend.

Tullamore is the first town mentioned in the original (Australian) version of the song "I've Been Everywhere".

History
The area known as Tullamore was first settled as "Bullock Creek" in 1870. The post office opened under that name on 1 April 1890. It was then renamed Gobondery. In 1895 Jim Tully, whose family came from Tullamore in Ireland, built a hotel and called it "Tullie's Exchange Hotel". The Kerley family, also from the Tullamore area in Ireland, settled on a nearby property and called it Tullamore Station. It is believed that the town obtained its name from this property. The post office was officially renamed "Tullamore" in 1895.

Climate

Tullamore Show Grounds
The Tullamore Show Grounds on Corbet Street hosts the annual Tullamore Show each August.

References

External links

Towns in New South Wales
Parkes Shire